The 1956–57 season was the fifty-fifth season in which Dundee competed at a Scottish national level, playing in Division One, where the club would finish in 10th place. Dundee would also compete in both the Scottish Cup and the Scottish League Cup. They would be knocked out by Clyde in the 5th round of the Scottish Cup via replay, but would make it to the Semi-finals of the League Cup before being defeated in a replay by Partick Thistle. The club's home shirt would change collar-style, from button-up to V-neck, with white arm borders and red socks returning, while the navy short borders were removed.

Scottish Division One 

Statistics provided by Dee Archive.

League table

Scottish League Cup 

Statistics provided by Dee Archive.

Group 1

Group 1 table

Knockout stage

Scottish Cup 

Statistics provided by Dee Archive.

Player Statistics 
Statistics provided by Dee Archive

|}

See also 

 List of Dundee F.C. seasons

References

External links 

 1956-57 Dundee season on Fitbastats

Dundee F.C. seasons
Dundee